
Year 447 BC was a year of the pre-Julian Roman calendar. At the time, it was known as the Year of the Consulship of Macerinus and Iullus (or, less frequently, year 307 Ab urbe condita). The denomination 447 BC for this year has been used since the early medieval period, when the Anno Domini calendar era became the prevalent method in Europe for naming years.

Events 
 By place 
 Greece 
 Pericles leads Athenian forces in the expulsion of barbarians from the Thracian peninsula of Gallipoli, in order to establish Athenian colonists in the region. Thus Pericles starts a policy of cleruchy (klerouchos) or "out-settlements". This is a form of colonisation where poor and unemployed people are assisted to emigrate to new regions.
 A revolt breaks out in Boeotia as the oligarchs of Thebes conspire against the democratic faction in the city. The Athenians, under their general Tolmides, with 1000 hoplites plus other troops from their allies, march into Boeotia to take back the towns revolting against Athenian control. They capture Chaeronea, but are attacked and defeated by the Boeotians at Coronea. As a result, the Athenians are forced to give up control of Boeotia as well as Phocis and Locris, which all fall under the control of hostile oligarchs who quit the Delian League.
 The middle component of the Long Walls from Athens to the port of Piraeus is completed.

 By subject 
 Literature 
 Achaeus of Eretria, a Greek playwright, produces his first play.

 Architecture 
 Pericles commissions the architects Kallikrates and Iktinos to design a larger temple for the Parthenon and the construction begins on rebuilding the great temple of Athena (the Parthenon) on the Acropolis at Athens soon afterwards.

Births

Deaths

References